The 1986–87 season was the 63rd season in the existence of AEK Athens F.C. and the 28th consecutive season in the top flight of Greek football. They competed in the Alpha Ethniki, the Greek Cup and the UEFA Cup. The season began on 7 September 1986 and finished on 7 June 1987.

Overview

In the summer of 1986, AEK Athens continued to be administratively at the hands of Andreas Zafiropoulos. The reactions of the fans towards the administration became even more intense, while the financial problems began to appear in the club. Nevertheless, AEK proceeded with the transfers of Dimitris Pittas from PAOK, Giorgos Peppes from Ethnikos Piraeus and Georgiadis from Anagennisi Arta, while in the winter transfer window they were also strengthened with Rajko Janjanin, from OFI. At the same time, however, Esterházy left for Panathinaikos and Ballis returned to Aris. As for the wheel of the team, Zafiropoulos decided to entrust it to a practitioner of the Dutch "school" and brought Ab Fafié to Athens and signed him on July 7. The Dutch coach presented himself as a strict coach and from his first days on the yellow and black bench and punished various players in order to impose himself in the locker rooms of the club. The expectations in his person were high, but his term at AEK was crowned with absolute failure. AEK faced many problems beyond the financial ones. Thomas Mavros was suffering from injuries and Esterházy was in bad condition. In addition, AEK started the championship with 3 points deducted, from a punishment that they "carried" from the previous season, due to the "Chrysovitsianos" case. The team continued to use the Athens Olympic Stadium as their home ground and this would be another "weight" during the season.

AEK started the championship badly. Even though they prevailed in difficult grounds, such as Aris Stadium and Alkazar Stadium, they won at home only once against PAS Giannina in the 2nd matchday. It was noteworthy that it took 5 months to win again at home. In the UEFA Cup, AEK were unlucky since they were drawn against Internazionale of Giovanni Trapattoni with players such as Pasarella, Rummenigge and Bergomi. In the first match at San Siro, AEK stood with the demands and surprised by their performance, especially in the first half during which they had the opportunity to score a goal. However, in the second half, they conceded the two goals that shaped the final result, in a match that was attended by about 1,000 Greek fans. In Athens, Inter took the lead very quickly and ended the qualifying case. However, the players of AEK tried their best and had two opportunities in the first half, while in the second there was a significant improvement with the creation of several dangerous chances, but without scoring a goal. At the end of the first half, the Swedish referee, Eriksson did not count AEK's goal, as he whistled for half time in a corner kick while the ball was midair and fractions of a second before the ball reached the net, to everyone's surprise, which irritated the crowd.

In the Cup, AEK exceeded the obstacle of Olympiacos Volos in the first round, but were eliminated at the next round by Panionios at the extra time. Fafié was fired in December and would take over the bench of the only team he ever won at home, while in another game of fate for the club, their former coach beat them as an opponent in the game of the second round at Ioannina.

In one of the worst choices at his spell as president of the club, Zafiropoulos entrusted the technical leadership of AEK to Nikos Alefantos. The team continued their instability in their performances until the end of one of the worst seasons in their history. The fans were running out of patience for a long time and found the opportunity to break out at 11 April, in the home game against Apollon Kalamarias. The match was at the 80th minute and AEK was ahead by 2–0, when Alefantos provocatively subbed off Thomas Mavros, who had returned after many months of injury. In the press conference of the match, Alefantos spoke out against Mavros, considering him "finished" as a footballer.  All that in combination with the unjustified tolerance of the administration, led to the departure of Mavros from the team as a result of which that would be his final match at AEK. Shortly after, Alefantos was sacked and AEK finished the season with Nikos Christidis as an interim coach. In the last 3 games of the league, AEK did compete along with 11 other clubs in the strike declared by the Footballers' Union. The result of their participation in the strike was the deduction of 6 points, which in the end did not affect the final standings. Eventually, AEK finished in 7th place, 30 points behind the champions Olympiacos. Theologis Papadopoulos, Stelios Manolas and Jim Patikas were the players whose performances stood out, in a very bad season for the team.

Players

Squad information

NOTE: The players are the ones that have been announced by the AEK Athens' press release. No edits should be made unless a player arrival or exit is announced. Updated 30 June 1987, 23:59 UTC+3.

Transfers

In

Summer

Winter

Out

Summer

Winter

Loan out

Summer

Overall transfer activity

Expenditure
Summer:  ₯12,000,000

Winter:  ₯0

Total:  ₯12,000,000

Income
Summer:  ₯0

Winter:  ₯0

Total:  ₯0

Net Totals
Summer:  ₯12,000,000

Winter:  ₯0

Total:  ₯12,000,000

Pre-season and friendlies

Alpha Ethniki

League table

Results summary

Results by Matchday

Fixtures

Greek Cup

Matches

UEFA Cup

First round

Statistics

Squad statistics

! colspan="11" style="background:#FFDE00; text-align:center" | Goalkeepers
|-

! colspan="11" style="background:#FFDE00; color:black; text-align:center;"| Defenders
|-

! colspan="11" style="background:#FFDE00; color:black; text-align:center;"| Midfielders
|-

! colspan="11" style="background:#FFDE00; color:black; text-align:center;"| Forwards
|-

! colspan="11" style="background:#FFDE00; color:black; text-align:center;"| Left during Winter Transfer Window
|-

! colspan="11" style="background:#FFDE00; color:black; text-align:center;"| From Reserve Squad
|-

|}

Disciplinary record

|-
! colspan="17" style="background:#FFDE00; text-align:center" | Goalkeepers

|-
! colspan="17" style="background:#FFDE00; color:black; text-align:center;"| Defenders

|-
! colspan="17" style="background:#FFDE00; color:black; text-align:center;"| Midfielders

|-
! colspan="17" style="background:#FFDE00; color:black; text-align:center;"| Forwards

|-
! colspan="17" style="background:#FFDE00; color:black; text-align:center;"| Left during Winter Transfer Window

|-
! colspan="17" style="background:#FFDE00; color:black; text-align:center;"| From Reserve Squad

|}

References

External links
AEK Athens F.C. Official Website

AEK Athens F.C. seasons
AEK Athens